is a railway station in Akiha-ku, Niigata, Japan, operated by East Japan Railway Company (JR East).

Lines
Niitsu Station is served by the following three lines.

It is the terminus of the Uetsu Main Line and the Banetsu West Line.

Station layout
Niitsu Station has one side platform (1) and two island platforms (2/3, 4/5) connected by a footbridge. The station has a Midori no Madoguchi staffed ticket office. The platforms are not assigned to any particular line or service, but are used in common by all three lines serving the station.

History
Niitsu Station opened on 20 November 1897. With the privatization of Japanese National Railways (JNR) on 1 April 1987, the station came under the control of JR East.

Passenger statistics
In fiscal 2017, the station was used by an average of 4,341 passengers daily (boarding passengers only).

Surrounding area
 
 Japan Transport Engineering Company Niitsu Plant
 Niigata University of Pharmacy and Applied Life Sciences

Gallery

See also
 List of railway stations in Japan

References

External links

 JR East station information 

Railway stations in Niigata Prefecture
Uetsu Main Line
Shin'etsu Main Line
Ban'etsu West Line
Railway stations in Japan opened in 1897
Railway stations in Niigata (city)